St. Michael's Catholic Church is a local Catholic church in Tybee Island, Georgia, which is situated in the Roman Catholic Diocese of Savannah.

History 
St. Michael's was built in 1891 under the direction Bishop Thomas A. Becker, and with the assistance of Vicar General Edward D. Cafferty, and Reverend W.A. McCarthy. Its opening garnered about 200 congregants to the church, which "filled the little church with overflowing."

The church ran a parochial school, also called St. Michael's, in Tybee Island from 1941 to 2010. The school is now a public school called the Tybee Island Maritime Academy.

Ministries 
Several ministries are run by St. Michael's, including a music ministry run by its music director Ryan Beke.

References 

Churches in Georgia (U.S. state)